Portland Commercial Historic District is a national historic district located at Portland, Jay County, Indiana.  It encompasses 58 contributing buildings, 1 contributing structure, and 1 contributing object in the central business district of Portland.  The district developed between about 1870 and 1945, and includes notable examples of Italianate, Romanesque Revival, Classical Revival, and Early Commercial style architecture. Located in the district is the separately listed Jay County Courthouse.  Other notable contributing resources include the U.S. Post Office (1914) designed by the Office of the Supervising Architect under Oscar Wenderoth, Portland Fire Station #1 (1929), Citizens Bank (c. 1875, 1912), FOE Eagles Lodge (1883), Johnson Building (c. 1900), Stevens Building (1910), Walnut Street Church of Christ (1913), and South Meridian Street Bridge (1914).

It was listed on the National Register of Historic Places in 1996.

References

External links

Historic American Buildings Survey in Indiana
Historic districts on the National Register of Historic Places in Indiana
Italianate architecture in Indiana
Romanesque Revival architecture in Indiana
Neoclassical architecture in Indiana
Historic districts in Jay County, Indiana
National Register of Historic Places in Jay County, Indiana